In Greek mythology, Amaracus is a young Cypriot boy who transformed into a marjoram plant, one of Aphrodite's most commonly associated plants.

Mythology 
On the island of Cyprus, Amaracus was the royal perfumer in the court of King Cinyras, his father. One day Amaracus fell by chance while carrying the ointments, thus creating a greater odor from the confusion of said ointments. Afterwards, he was turned into the amarakon herb (the marjoram), which was also said to be sweet, a plant sacred to the goddess of love and beauty, Aphrodite. As the son of Cinyras, this would make Amaracus the brother of Smyrna, another mortal turned into an aromatic plant with connections to Aphrodite.

Culture 
The ancient Greeks associated the marjoram with Aphrodite, as they believed she had created it. In antiquity, the island of Cyprus, where the myth takes place and also a major cult center for Aphrodite, was noted for its large marjoram production; to this day, Cyprus still produces aromatic and therapeutic oils of marjoram. Marjoram was also utilised as a strong aphrodisiac, while it was also believed to cure snakebites, and both ancient Greeks and Romans adorned bridal wreaths with this herb.

See also 

 Adonis
 Melus
 Peristera

References

Bibliography 
 
 
 
 
 Maurus Servius Honoratus. In Vergilii carmina comentarii. Servii Grammatici qui feruntur in Vergilii carmina commentarii; recensuerunt Georgius Thilo et Hermannus Hagen. Georgius Thilo. Leipzig. B. G. Teubner. 1881.

Metamorphoses into flowers in Greek mythology
Princes in Greek mythology
Deeds of Aphrodite
Cypriot mythology
Family of Adonis